Konrad Kwiet (born 1941) is a historian and scholar of the Holocaust. He is currently Pratt Foundation Professor at the University of Sydney and Resident Historian at the Sydney Jewish Museum. He has worked in universities, museums and research centres around the world, including Heidelberg, Israel, Washington DC, Oxford and Berlin.

Career
Konrad Kwiet was born in Swinemünde in 1941 and educated in Amsterdam and Berlin. He studied history at the Technical University of Berlin, completing his PhD on Nazi policy in the Netherlands. Kwiet emigrated to Australia in 1976 to take up a lecturing position at the University of New South Wales. He retired as Emeritus Professor from Macquarie University in 2000 and is currently Pratt Foundation Professor for Jewish History and Holocaust Studies at the University of Sydney.  From 1987 to 1994, he was Chief Historical Consultant to the Special Investigations Unit investigating Nazi war criminals in Australia, set up after research by the journalist Mark Aarons.

Kwiet has appeared regularly in the Australian media to comment on historical debates and events, such as the Daniel Goldhagen debate, the work of Simon Wiesenthal, the Holocaust, and genocide.

In 2022, Kwiet was put in charge of an investigation into the Nazi connections of Lithuanian-Australian art collector Bob Sredersas.

Books
Contemporary Responses to the Holocaust (2004, together with J Matthaeus)
Einsatz im Reichkommissariat Ostland (1998, together with W Benz and J Matthaeus)
Selbstbehauptung und Widerstand (1984, together with H Eschwege)
Reichskommissariat Niederlande (1968)
Ausbildungsziel Judenmord? (2003, together with J.Matthaueus,J.Foerster and R. Breitman)

References

External links
 https://web.archive.org/web/20130119035000/http://www.jwire.com.au/news/face-to-face-with-professor-konrad-kwiet/24267
 http://sydney.edu.au/research/opportunities/supervisors/824
 http://www.sbs.com.br/9780195389159/APPROACHING-AN-AUSCHWITZ-SURVIVOR/?codigo_produto=101438858
 http://www.abc.net.au/radionational/programs/lifematters/holocaust-loot-online/2947812
 http://www.smh.com.au/articles/2002/04/28/1019441328553.html
 http://www.spiegel.de/spiegel/print/d-13531193.html

Living people
1941 births
Technical University of Berlin alumni
Academic staff of the University of New South Wales
Academic staff of Macquarie University
Historians of the Holocaust
Academic staff of the University of Sydney
People from Świnoujście